Willem van Riet (born 3 October 1969) is a South African sprint canoer who competed in the early 1990s. At the 1992 Summer Olympics in Barcelona, he was eliminated in the repechages of both the K-1 500 m and the K-2 1000 m events.

References
Sports-Reference.com profile

1969 births
Canoeists at the 1992 Summer Olympics
Living people
Olympic canoeists of South Africa
South African male canoeists